Stanya Kahn (born 1968) is an American video artist.  She graduated magna cum laude from San Francisco State University and received an MFA in 2003 from the Milton Avery Graduate School of the Arts at Bard College. Kahn lives and works in Los Angeles, California.

Solo career 
Kahn's work intertwines personal and universal pain with off-the-wall humor, blurring the lines between fiction and document. She uses tightly written scripts in addition to her trained improvisation to complement her documentary-style and experimental videos. Kahn is often the main subject of her films, portraying lowly, powerless characters, which she hopes audiences can relate to.

Previous to and during her collaboration with Harry Dodge, Kahn made solo performance works and collaborated with performers and choreographers Keith Hennessy, CORE, and Ishmael Houston Jones, touring live shows worldwide from 1992-2000. Kahn starred in and was a contributing writer for the independent feature film By Hook or By Crook (2001), which won numerous awards and was an official selection at the Sundance Film Festival.

Outside of video, Kahn's writings have appeared in journals including Nothing Moments, LTTR and Movement Research. She has taught as adjunct faculty in New Genres at UCLA, Photo/Media at Cal Arts, Visual Arts/Media and Critical Gender Studies at UCSD, and has taught in the MFA programs at USC and UCLA. Her 2014 solo show, Die Laughing, consisted of her film Don't Go Back to Sleep and accompanying paintings and drawings.

Kahn's newest film, No Go Backs (2020), is unlike her previous works. Instead of a script-driven comedy, Kahn's son and his friend silently navigate a post-apocalyptic city. Though the artist filmed No Go Backs before COVID-19, her video is full of emptiness with glimmers of possibility: a fitting theme amidst the pandemic.

Artwork

All Together Now, 2014 
All Together Now is a film directed by Stanya Kahn and Harry Dodge. This film is approximately 20 minutes long. The film opens to an abandoned town where only the main character, portrayed by Kahn, is seen bludgeoning something out of frame. The scene depicts an apocalyptic world in which material possessions are valued over life. Khan is characterized by her makeup and outfit being almost feral and caveman-like in nature. Further into the film, there are scenes depicting cults like the Ku Klux Klan and Abu Ghraib. There is an eerie undertone of violence and acceptance of this violence. Even the cinematography is done deliberately to ensue a sense of chaos. The scenes change rapidly and the camera shakes, projecting the characters emotions onto the audience. Furthermore, scenes change rapidly between Kahn, who is alone in an isolated environment, and depictions of a group in masks assembling to build something. This disposition between the two shots gives viewers a sense of uncertainty about what the masked people are going to do. Between the shots of people, there are also shots of dead animals, in which they are brutally killed, and you can see the natural deterioration of their bodies. This insertion of animals between clips emphasizes the animalistic tendencies in the post-apocalyptic world. In an interview, Dodge says, “I gave myself permission to communicate with people who were already interested in art”, suggesting that the audience is meant to understand that the film is a piece of art rather than a film for a wide range of audiences that are unsure of what they are watching.

Collaborations with Harry Dodge 
In the early 1990s, Kahn met Harry Dodge, a video artist. The two began collaborating at Bard College in 2002. Because of Kahn's history in performance art and Dodge's film experience, the duo mostly consisted of Dodge behind the camera and Kahn in front of it.

Their comedic videos satirize the awkwardness of artmaking, video, and gender and are often deemed strange and ludicrous. In Can't Swallow It, Can't Spit It Out (2006), Kahn is a bloody-nosed Valkyrie, holding a foam cheese block and babbling down the streets of Los Angeles. Beyond their humor, Kahn and Dodge's videos touch upon the darker seriousness of trauma, privilege, and politics.

Among several other museums and events, Kahn and Dodge's work has been shown in numerous venues nationally and internationally, including:

 The 2008 Whitney Biennial  
 The 2010 California Biennial at the Orange County Museum of Art
 Getty Center, Los Angeles
 Hammer Museum, Los Angeles
 The Museum of Contemporary Art, Los Angeles 
 The Museum of Modern Art, New York
 Sundance Film Festival, Utah

Achievements 

 2012 – John Simon Guggenheim Memorial Foundation Fellowship
 2012 – Jury Prize: Best Short, Narrative Fiction, Migrating Forms Film Festival
 2013 – Artadia Award, Los Angeles
 2015 – San Francisco Art Institute Artist-in-Residence

References

External links 
 Harry Dodge and Stanya Kahn's Ubuweb video page
 Stanya Kahn's website
 Vielmetter Los Angeles' page
 All Together Now Vimeo

Further reading 

 Bell, Natalie & Burton, Johanna (2017). Trigger: Gender as a Tool and a Weapon. New York, NY: New Museum. .
 Kahn and Dodge's interview with Michael Smith in Bomb Magazine
 Phillips, Glenn (2008). California Video: Artists and Histories. Los Angeles, CA: Getty Research Institute. .
 Kushner, Rachel.  ARTFORUM INTERNATIONAL; ARTFORUM Vol. 46, Iss. 5, (Jan 2008): 240-243.
Rosenthal, Tracy Jeanne. Stanya Kahn. Art in America (1939), 2015, Vol.103 (6), p.130
Greg, A. E. (2010). Artistic intervention in the Los Angeles urban geography: The art practices of Charles Long, Harry Dodge and Stanya Kahn. ProQuest Dissertation Publishing.
 
Jennings, G. (Ed.). (2015). Abstract Video: The Moving Image in Contemporary Art (1st ed.). University of California Press. http://www.jstor.org/stable/10.1525/j.ctt1963294

Living people
American video artists
1968 births